Silpakorn University (SU.) is a national university in Thailand. The university was founded in Bangkok in 1943 by Tuscan–born art professor Corrado Feroci, who took the Thai name Silpa Bhirasri when he became a Thai citizen. It began as a fine arts university and now includes many other faculties as well. In 2016, it has 25,210 students.

History 

Silpakorn University was originally established as the School of Fine Arts under Thailand's Fine Arts Department in 1933. The school offered the only painting and sculpture programs and waived tuition fees for government officials and students. Its creation owes much to the almost lifetime devotion of Professor Silpa Bhirasri, an Italian sculptor (formerly Corrado Feroci) who was commissioned during the reign of King Rama VI to work in the Fine Arts Department. He subsequently enlarged his classes to include greater members of the interested public before setting up the School of Fine Arts. The school gradually developed and was officially accorded a new status and named Silpakorn University on 12 October 1943. Its inaugural faculty was the Faculty of Painting and Sculpture. In 1955, the Faculty of Thai Architecture was established, later named the Faculty of Architecture) and two more faculties were created, the Faculty of Archaeology and the Faculty of Decorative Arts.

In 1966, Silpakorn University diversified the four faculties into sub–specializations to broaden its offerings, but the university's Wang Tha Phra campus proved inadequate. A new campus, Sanam Chandra Palace, was established in Nakhon Pathom Province in the former residential compound of King Rama VI. The first two faculties based on this campus were the Faculty of Arts in 1968 and the Faculty of Education in 1970. Later, three more faculties were created: the Faculty of Science in 1972, the Faculty of Pharmacy in 1986, and the Faculty of Engineering and Industrial Technology in 1992. In 1999, the Faculty of Music was created.

In 1997, Silpakorn extended its reach by establishing a new campus in Phetchaburi Province. The new campus was named "Phetchaburi Information Technology Campus". In 2001 and 2002, the Faculty of Animal Sciences and Agricultural Technology and the Faculty of Management Science were established on the Phetchaburi Campus. In 2003, the Faculty of Information and Communication Technology (ICT) was established, as well as Silpakorn University International College (SUIC). Its role is to provide an international curriculum in additional fields of study.

Ganesha, one of the Hindu deities symbolizing arts and crafts, is Silpakorn University's emblem. The "university tree" is the chan tree.

Campuses

Tha Phra Palace 
Tha Phra Palace was Silpakorn's first campus. It occupies a small part of the inner city of Bangkok known as Rattanakosin Island. Opposite the Grand Palace and covering an area of 8 rai, the campus was once the palace of Prince Narisara Nuwattiwong. On its west side is the Chao Phraya River. The office of the university president is in Taling Chan District, Bangkok.

Sanam Chandra Palace Campus 
Sanam Chandra Palace Campus is on the grounds of Sanam Chandra Palace in Nakhon Pathom which was once the royal pavilion of King Rama VI of Chakri dynasty. It occupies 440 rai.

Phetchaburi Information Technology Campus 
The 820 rai Phetchaburi Information Technology Campus is in Phetchaburi Province.

Faculties 
 Faculty of Painting, Sculpture and Graphic Arts
 Faculty of Architecture
 Faculty of Archaeology
 Faculty of Decorative Arts
 Faculty of Arts
 Faculty of Education
 Faculty of Science
 Faculty of Pharmacy
 Faculty of Engineering and Industrial Technology
 Faculty of Music
 Faculty of Animal Sciences and Agricultural Technology
 Faculty of Management Science
 Faculty of Information and Communication Technology
 Silpakorn University International College (SUIC)
 Graduate School

Notable alumni
 Princess Maha Chakri Sirindhorn – Princess of Thailand
 Princess Chulabhorn – Princess of Thailand
 Princess Siribhachudabhorn – Princess of Thailand
 Angkarn Kalayanapong – National Artist of Thailand (Literature), poet
 Chalermchai Kositpipat – National Artist of Thailand (Fine art and visual art), Founder of the White Temple (Wat Rong Khun)
 Thawan Duchanee – National Artist of Thailand (Fine art and visual art)
 Chavalit Soemprungsuk – National Artist of Thailand (visual art), painter

Gallery

See also
 Silpakorn University Art Gallery
 Education in Thailand
 List of universities and colleges in Thailand
 Lists of universities and colleges

References

External links

 Official website of Silpakorn University
 Social News Silpakorn

 
Universities and colleges in Bangkok
Educational institutions established in 1943
Phra Nakhon district
1943 establishments in Thailand
Art schools in Thailand